Kitchener's Horse were a colonial unit of the British Army during the Boer War of 1899–1902.

References

Military units and formations of the Second Boer War
Military units and formations of the British Empire